Farnham is a small village in Essex, England, situated near Bishop's Stortford. The main features are Farnham Church of England Primary School, the church and the Three Horseshoes pub in Hazel End, which some consider a hamlet in its own right. The population is approximately 300, increasing to 410 at the 2011 census. It is divided up into several areas, such as Farnham, Hazel End, Bell's Cottages, Saven End and Farnham Green.
The name is derived from the Fernham (Hamlet in the ferns).

This village is also mentioned in the Anglo-Saxon Chronicle as the site of a battle between King Alfred’s army and a Viking army that had captured a great war-booty in 893. King Alfred defeated the Vikings and recovered the booty.

Þa hie gefengon micle herehyð, & þa woldon ferian norþweardes ofer Temese in on Eastseaxe ongean þa scipu. Þa forrad sio fierd hie foran, & him wið gefeaht æt Fearnhamme, & þone here gefliemde, & þa herehyþa ahreddon...

They (the Vikings) had now seized much booty, and would ferry it northward over Thames into Essex, to meet their ships.  But the army (king Alfred’s) rode before them, fought with them at Farnham, routed their forces, and there arrested the booty...

Farnham is mentioned in the Domesday Book as one of the settlements in Clavering hundred.

Farnham Primary School
Farnham C of E Primary School is a primary school in Farnham, Essex, England. Farnham Primary School is located on the Essex/Herts county border, within two miles (3 km) of Stansted Mountfitchet and Bishop's Stortford, and takes pupils from both counties.

Founded in 1874, Farnham primary is Essex's smallest school with 32 pupils in 2014. It has two classes: Willow (from Reception to Year 3) and Horse Chestnut (Year 4 to Year 6). Children graduating from Farnham mostly attend secondary schools in Bishop's Stortford and it lies within Birchwood High Schools priority admissions area.

The school is in federation with the larger nearby Rickling Church of England Primary School, where pupils visit weekly for curriculum enrichment activities, including art, gardening, drama, yoga and sports. Both schools share an executive head and deputy head. The deputy head teaches Horse Chestnut class in Farnham.

Farnham primary enjoys consistently good SATS results. In 2013, 100% of Year 6 pupils achieved Level 4+ and 50% achieved Level 5 in mathematics and reading. This compares very favourably with the national average and out-performs most schools in the area.

In 2014, the school was the subject of a high-profile campaign to keep it in Farnham and prevent it from moving to nearby Stansted Mountfitchet, as proposed by Essex County Council and the Diocese Board of Education for Chelmsford. The proposals were unanimously opposed by the parish councils of Farnham and Stansted and the Farnham parochial church. In response, the school governors voted to reject the proposals.

See also
The Hundred Parishes

References

External links

 
 Ofsted Parent View

Villages in Essex
Uttlesford